Carboxypeptidase Z is an enzyme that in humans is encoded by the CPZ gene.

This gene encodes a member of the metallocarboxypeptidase family. This enzyme displays carboxypeptidase activity towards substrates with basic C-terminal residues. It is most active at neutral pH and is inhibited by active site-directed inhibitors of metallocarboxypeptidases. Alternative splicing in the coding region results in multiple transcript variants encoding different isoforms.

References

External links

Further reading